Portage is a city in Kalamazoo County in the U.S. state of Michigan. The population was 46,292 in the 2010 census.  It is the smaller of the two main cities included in the Kalamazoo-Portage Metropolitan Statistical Area, which has a population of 326,589 as of 2010. Portage is known for its Pharmaceutical manufacturing and celery agriculture. On February 19, 2021, the president of the United States, Joe Biden, visited Portage to commemorate the production of the Pfizer Vaccine.

Geography

Austin Lake is in the southeast part of the city and was named for Moses Austin, who had emigrated to Portage Township from Genesee County, New York, in 1833. A settlement grew on the north shore of the lake, known as Austin or Austin Lake. A post office named "Austin's Lake" was established on May 18, 1850, with Austin as postmaster, and operated until August 15, 1853. The place was also a station on the Grand Rapids and Indiana Railroad in 1867.  West Lake is adjacent to Austin Lake with Portage Road running between the two lakes.

Demographics

2010 census
At the 2010 census there were 46,292 people, 19,199 households, and 12,426 families living in the city. The racial makeup of the city was 86.9% White, 4.9% African American, 0.4% Native American, 3.8% Asian, 1.0% from other races, and 3.0% from two or more races. Hispanic or Latino of any race were 3.1%.

Of the 19,199 households 32.4% had children under the age of 18 living with them, 50.1% were married couples living together, 10.9% had a female householder with no husband present, 3.8% had a male householder with no wife present, and 35.3% were non-families. 29.1% of households were one person and 10.5% were one person aged 65 or older. The average household size was 2.40 and the average family size was 2.98.

The median age was 38.1 years. 24.8% of residents were under the age of 18; 7.9% were between the ages of 18 and 24; 26.7% were from 25 to 44; 26.9% were from 45 to 64; and 13.6% were 65 or older. The gender makeup of the city was 47.9% male and 52.1% female.

2000 census
As of the census of 2000, there were 44,897 people, 18,138 households, and 12,134 families living in the city. The racial makeup of the city was 90.75% White, 3.73% African American, 0.30% Native American, 2.64% Asian, 0.02% Pacific Islander, 0.70% from other races, and 1.84% from two or more races. Hispanic or Latino of any race were 1.93% of the population.

Of the 18,138 households 34.2% had children under the age of 18 living with them, 54.4% were married couples living together, 9.7% had a female householder with no husband present, and 33.1% were non-families. 27.2% of households were one person and 8.4% were one person aged 65 or older.  The average household size was 2.45 and the average family size was 3.01.

The age distribution was 26.4% under the age of 18, 8.5% from 18 to 24, 29.9% from 25 to 44, 23.4% from 45 to 64, and 11.8% 65 or older.  The median age was 36 years. For every 100 females, there were 92.1 males.  For every 100 females age 18 and over, there were 88.8 males.

The median household income was $49,410 and the median family income  was $61,285. Males had a median income of $42,377 versus $29,399 for females. The per capita income for the city was $25,414.  About 3.1% of families and 4.8% of the population were below the poverty line, including 4.9% of those under age 18 and 4.2% of those age 65 or over.

Education
Most of Portage is in the Portage Public Schools school district. Some of Portage is in Comstock Public Schools, some is in Vicksburg Community Schools, and some is in Schoolcraft Community Schools.

Health care 
Portage is the site of Pfizer's largest manufacturing facility, at 1,300 acres.  The U.S. government prepped millions of doses of Pfizer-BioNTech's coronavirus vaccine on December 13, 2020, for shipment to sites across the nation, a mammoth logistical undertaking in support of the most complex immunization program in history.

References

External links

 City of Portage

Cities in Kalamazoo County, Michigan
Portages in the United States
Populated places established in 1963